The World Triathlon Long Distance Championships is a triathlon race held annually since 1994. The championships involve a continuous swim-cycle-run, over distances varying between that of an Olympic-distance and an Iron-distance triathlon race. The championships are organised by World Triathlon.

Venues

Medallists

Men's championship

Women's championship

Notes

References

 
 

Triathlon, Long distance
Recurring sporting events established in 1994
Triathlon world championships